After Dinner is a play by Australian playwright Andrew Bovell. It was Bovell's first play, written in 1984, when he lived in Carlton, Melbourne.

After Dinner was first performed at La Mama Theatre in 1988, and went on to be performed throughout Australia.

It is still regularly performed.

Plot
An acutely observed but tender-hearted account of relationships and behaviour in a suburban pub bistro on a Friday night.

First Production
After Dinner was first performed at La Mama, Melbourne, on 20 April 1988 with the following cast:

GORDON:			Tom Gutteridge

DYMPIE:			Kim Trengove

PAULA:			Eugenia Fragos

MONIKA:			Leigh Morgan

STEPHEN:			Peter Murphy

Director, Kim Durban

Designer, Amanda Johnson

Stage Manager, Jane Allen

Music, Tom Gillick and The Heartbreaks

References

External links
Library holdings of After Dinner

1988 plays
Plays by Andrew Bovell